This is a list of the governors of the province of Paktika, Afghanistan.

Governors of Paktika Province

See also
 List of current governors of Afghanistan

Notes

Paktika